|}

The Prix Marcel Boussac is a Group 1 flat horse race in France open to two-year-old thoroughbred fillies. It is run at Longchamp over a distance of 1,600 metres (about 1 mile), and it is scheduled to take place each year in early October.

It is France's only Group 1 event exclusively for juvenile fillies. The leading participants usually become major contenders for the following year's fillies' Classics.

History
The event was established in 1969, and it was originally called the Critérium des Pouliches. The best two-year-old fillies had previously competed against male horses in the Grand Critérium.

The race was given its present title in 1980, in memory of Marcel Boussac (1889–1980). Boussac was a highly successful owner/breeder, and he served as chairman of the sport's former governing body in France, the Société d'Encouragement.

The Prix Marcel Boussac took place on Longchamp's middle course (moyenne piste) until 1986. It was switched to the main course (grande piste) in 1987.

The race is held on the same day as the Prix de l'Arc de Triomphe. The fixture is usually staged on the first Sunday in October.

Records
Leading jockey (3 wins):
 Lester Piggott – Vela (1969), Play It Safe (1981), Midway Lady (1985)
 Yves Saint-Martin – Allez France (1972), Theia (1975), Aryenne (1979)
 Alain Lequeux – Tropicaro (1980), Triptych (1984), Mary Linoa (1988)
 Willie Carson – Ashayer (1987), Salsabil (1989), Shadayid (1990)
 Olivier Peslier – Miss Tahiti (1995), Lady Of Chad (1999), Silasol (2012)

Leading trainer (5 wins):
 Pascal Bary – Sierra Madre (1993), Amonita (2000), Six Perfections (2002), Denebola (2003), Divine Proportions (2004)
 Criquette Head-Maarek – Gold Splash (1992), Macoumba (1994), Loving Claim (1997), Juvenia (1998), Proportional (2008)

Leading owner (4 wins): (includes part ownership)
 Niarchos Family – Six Perfections (2002), Denebola (2003), Divine Proportions (2004), Rumplestiltskin (2005)
 Michael Tabor - Rumplestiltskin (2005), Misty For Me (2010), Found (2014), Ballydoyle (2015)
 Susan Magnier – Rumplestiltskin (2005), Misty For Me (2010), Found (2014), Ballydoyle (2015)

Winners

See also
 List of French flat horse races
 Recurring sporting events established in 1969 – this race is included under its original title, Critérium des Pouliches.

References

 France Galop / Racing Post:

 galop.courses-france.com:
 1969–1979, 1980–present

 france-galop.com – A Brief History: Prix Marcel Boussac.
 galopp-sieger.de – Prix Marcel Boussac (ex Critérium des Pouliches).
 horseracingintfed.com – International Federation of Horseracing Authorities – Prix Marcel Boussac (2018).
 pedigreequery.com – Prix Marcel Boussac – Longchamp.

Flat horse races for two-year-old fillies
Longchamp Racecourse
Horse races in France
1969 establishments in France